Dacheng Ren is the Stevenson-endowed professor in the Department of Biomedical and Chemical Engineering at Syracuse University. He also serves as the director for the Syracuse Biomaterials Institute. Ren is known for research on biofilm growth and work on inhibition of bacterial growth on medical devices.

Biography
Ren earned his B.E. in Applied Chemistry & Electrical Engineering from the Shanghai Jiao Tong University in 1996. He earned his Master of Engineering in Chemical Engineering from Tianjin University, China in 1999. Ren came to the United States in 1999 as a graduate student at University of Connecticut, where he worked under Thomas K Wood. His 2003 PhD thesis was titled "Inhibition of bacterial multicellular behavior by natural brominated furanones". He was a postdoctoral associate, working with Kelvin H. Lee, in the Chemical Engineering department at Cornell University from 2003 until 2005.

After his finishing his post-doctoral appointment at Cornell in 2006, Ren began his career as professor of at Syracuse University. He was awarded tenure in May 2011 and became a full professor in May 2016. Ren has published over 100 papers and books on biofilm related topics and holds 11 U.S. patents.

Ren serves on the editorial board of Elsevier's Biofilm journals.

In July 2009, Ren received an Early Career Translational Research Award in Biomedical Engineering from the Wallace H. Coulter Foundation. In 2010, he was named the College Technology Educator of the Year by the Technology Alliance of Central New York . In 2011, he received the NSF-CAREER award.

In 2022, he was elected as Fellow at the American Institute for Medical and Biological Engineering.

References

External links

Living people
Year of birth missing (living people)
20th-century Chinese engineers
21st-century Chinese engineers
21st-century American engineers
American biochemists
American bioengineers
American chemical engineers
Engineers from New York (state)
Scientists from New York (state)
People's Republic of China emigrants to the United States
Fellows of the American Institute for Medical and Biological Engineering
Shanghai Jiao Tong University alumni
Tianjin University alumni
University of Connecticut alumni
Cornell University alumni
Syracuse University faculty